Star Trek III.4 is a 1979 video game designed by Lance Micklus and published by The Software Exchange for the TRS-80.

Contents
Star Trek III.4 is a Star Trek game where there are 20 Klingon battle cruisers to attack with phasers and photon torpedoes, and the player also controls science and ship's computers, warp drive, impulse engines, long and short range sensors, and can call status and damage reports.

Reception
Bruce Campbell reviewed Star Trek III.4 in The Space Gamer No. 36. Campbell commented that "Star Trek III.4 has provided many hours of entertainment. If you are looking for a moderately complex space simulation, I recommend this one."

Reviews
Moves #55, p32

References

External links
review
C+VG
SoftSide review

1979 video games
Space combat simulators
TRS-80 games
TRS-80-only games
Video games based on Star Trek
Video games developed in the United States